Orangeville may refer to:

Places
Orangeville is the name of several places:

In Australia:
 Orangeville, New South Wales

In Canada:
 Orangeville, Ontario

In the United States:
 Orangeville, Illinois
 Orangeville, DeKalb County, Indiana, hamlet in DeKalb County
 Orangeville, Orange County, Indiana
 Orangeville, New York
 Orangeville, Ohio
 Orangeville, Pennsylvania
 Orangeville, Utah
 Orangeville Township, Orange County, Indiana
 Orangeville Township, Michigan
 Rise at Orangeville, a natural spring in Orange County, Indiana

Schools
 Orangeville District Secondary School, Orangeville, Ontario, Canada
 Orangeville High School, Orangeville, Illinois, USA; a combined elementary-middle-high school

Other uses
 , a WWII Castle class corvette
 Orangeville Junction, Utah, USA; a road junction
 Orangeville Brampton Railway, Ontario, Canada

See also

 
 Orangeville Aerodrome

 Orange (disambiguation)
 ville (disambiguation)